George Watt may refer to:

George Watt (botanist) (1851–1930), British botanist and academic
George Watt (public servant) (1890–1983), Australian public servant and company director
George Watt (rugby league) (1917–2010), Australian player
George D. Watt (1812–1881), British religious leader
George Fiddes Watt (1873–1960), British portrait painter
George W. Watt (1911–1980), American chemist, participated in the Manhattan Project
George Watt (1913-1994), Jewish-American commissar of the Abraham Lincoln Brigade and veteran of the Second World War. Escaped both from Gandesa across the Ebro (as recounted by Earnest Hemingway), and from Nazi occupied Belgium via the Comet Line.

See also 
George Harvie-Watt (1903–1989), British Conservative Party politician
George Watts (disambiguation)

References